is a Japanese cyclist. He competed in the men's cross-country mountain biking event at the 2000 Summer Olympics.

References

1972 births
Living people
Japanese male cyclists
Olympic cyclists of Japan
Cyclists at the 2000 Summer Olympics
Sportspeople from Aichi Prefecture
Cyclists at the 2002 Asian Games
Asian Games competitors for Japan